Myriopteris covillei, formerly known as Cheilanthes covillei, is a species of cheilanthoid fern known by the common name Coville's lip fern. Coville's lip fern is native to the southwestern United States and Mexico.

Description
This fern has dark to medium green leaves (fronds) which may be up to 4-pinnate (made up of leaflets that subdivide up to 3 times), such that the leaflets are layered with overlapping rounded segments. The leaves as a whole have a bumpy, cobbled look when viewed from above. The edges of the leaflets are curled under (forming a false indusium) and their undersides have wide scales which are lengthened outgrowths of the epidermis. Tucked under the scales and false indusium are the sporangia, which make the spores. Myriopteris covillei can be distinguished from its very similar relative Myriopteris intertexta by the scales on the underside of the leaflets. These scales are up to 3 mm wide at their base in M. covillei, giving them an elongated triangular papery appearance, whereas those of M. intertexta are 1 mm wide, appearing more like a flattened thread.

Range and Habitat
Coville's lip fern is native to  California, Baja California, Arizona, Oregon, and Utah.

It grows in rocky crevices in the mountains and foothills. In California it is found in chaparral, yellow pine forest, pinyon-juniper woodland, and Joshua tree woodland habitats.

Taxonomy
Based on plastid DNA sequence, Myriopteris covillei is part of Myriopteris clade C (covillei clade) and is most closely related to Myriopteris clevelandii and Myriopteris gracillima. In addition, Myriopteris covillei is one of the parents of the fertile allotetraploid Myriopteris intertexta.

References

Works cited

External links
Jepson Manual eFlora (TJM2) treatment of Myriopteris covillei — formerly Cheilanthes covillei.
UC Photos gallery — Cheilanthes covillei

covillei
Ferns of California
Ferns of Mexico
Ferns of the United States
Flora of Arizona
Flora of Baja California
Flora of Oregon
Flora of Utah
Flora of the California desert regions
Flora of the Sierra Nevada (United States)
Natural history of the California chaparral and woodlands
Natural history of the Mojave Desert
Natural history of the Peninsular Ranges
Natural history of the Santa Monica Mountains
Natural history of the Transverse Ranges
Plants described in 1918